Ahmed Khalfan (Arabic: أحمد خلفان) (born 2 April 1991) is a Qatari footballer who plays as a midfielder.

External links
 

Qatari footballers
1991 births
Living people
Al-Arabi SC (Qatar) players
Al Kharaitiyat SC players
Qatar Stars League players
Association football midfielders